Godless Prophets & the Migrant Flora is the ninth studio album by American metal band Darkest Hour. It was released worldwide on March 10, 2017 through Southern Lord Records. The album features guest guitarist Kris Norris who previously played with the band from 2001 to 2008, contributing with some additional guitar work. Early preorders of the album were bundled with their first full-length live DVD recorded in 2015 for the 10th anniversary of Undoing Ruin. This was limited to 1,100 copies. The band made a digital version of the album available to fans who contributed to their Indiegogo campaign on February 17, 2017.

The album was the last to feature longtime lead guitarist Mike "Lonestar" Carrigan, who departed the band in July 2020.

Track listing

Personnel
Darkest Hour 
 John Henry – vocals
 Mike "Lonestar" Carrigan – lead guitar
 Mike Schleibaum – rhythm guitar
 Aaron Deal – bass
 Travis Orbin – drums

Additional personnel
 Kurt Ballou – production
 Kris Norris – guitar solo on "Beneath It Sleeps"
 John Connolly – guitar solo on "Timeless Numbers"
 Shaun Beaudry – album cover

Chart performance

References

2017 albums
Darkest Hour (band) albums
Southern Lord Records albums
Albums produced by Kurt Ballou